Fastjet Airlines Limited (Tanzania), also known as Fastjet Tanzania, was a low-cost airline that operated flights under the fastjet brand in Tanzania. The airline was founded in 2011 as Fly540 Tanzania, but through the acquisition of Fly540 in 2012, it was rebranded as Fastjet Tanzania. It was based in Dar es Salaam. The airline carried more than 350,000 passengers in its first year of operations and sold one million seats by December 2014. It went into liquidation on 25 November 2019.

History
Fastjet Tanzania was founded in 2011 as Fly540 Tanzania, a subsidiary of Kenya-based Fly540. Using a Bombardier CRJ100 and a Dash 8-100, it flew to eight destinations in Tanzania and two in Kenya.

In June 2012, Fly540 was acquired by Rubicon Diversified Investments, which intended to merge all of Fly540's operations into its new venture Fastjet. Fly540 Tanzania suspended operations on 13 October 2012 before being rebranded as Fastjet Tanzania.

Fastjet Tanzania started operations as Fastjet's first operating base in Africa, with flights from Julius Nyerere International Airport commencing on 29 November 2012. Initial flights operated successfully between Dar es Salaam and Kilimanjaro, and between Dar es Salaam and Mwanza. Further routes were to be added quickly, both domestically and to other East African destinations. By August 2015 it had come to operate domestic routes linking Dar es Salaam with Mwanza, Kilimanjaro and Mbeya, and four international routes from Dar es Salaam to Johannesburg, Harare, Entebbe, Lilongwe and Lusaka.

Ultimately unable to generate sufficient cash flow to cover its debts, the airline was declared insolvent and a liquidator appointed on 21 December 2019.

Corporate affairs

Ownership
Fastjet Tanzania was originally 49% owned by Fastjet Plc. On 14 November 2014 it was announced that Fastjet Plc had entered into an agreement to sell an interest in fastjet Tanzania to Tanzanian investors. The issue of the shares brought the total Tanzanian legal and beneficial ownership of fastjet Tanzania to 51%.

Business trends
Fastjet Tanzania began trading on 29 November 2012, and financial results were incorporated in the Fastjet Plc group accounts.  Some information had been made available for the Tanzanian operation (as at year ending 31 December):

Head office
Fastjet Tanzania maintains a head office in Samora Avenue, Dar es Salaam, Tanzania.

Destinations
As of March 2018, Fastjet Tanzania served the following destinations:

Cargo 
Fastjet signed an agreement with one of Africa's largest cargo operators, BidAir Cargo, to carry cargo on its fleet of Airbus A319s.

Fleet 
The Fastjet Tanzania fleet included the following aircraft as of June 2017:

See also
 List of airlines of Tanzania

References

External links
Official website (Mobile)

Defunct airlines of Tanzania
Airlines established in 2011
Airlines disestablished in 2019
Defunct low-cost airlines
2011 establishments in Tanzania